Agriculture in Nigeria is one of the major parts of the Nigerian economy, representing up to 35% of total national employment in 2020.  As reported by the FAO, agriculture remains the foundation of the Nigerian economy. It is the main source of livelihood for most Nigerians, both in terms of food production and providing millions of jobs. Along with crude oil, Nigeria relies on the agricultural products it exports to generate most of its national revenue.
The Agricultural sector in Nigeria is made up of four sub-sectors: crop production, livestock, forestry and fishing. 

Nigeria has a total agricultural area of 70.8m hectares. Of this total figure, the area of arable land is 34 million hectares, 6.5 million hectares for permanent crops, and 30.3 million hectares on meadows and pastures.

Maize, cassava, guinea corn and yam are the major crops farmed in Nigeria and 70 percent of households practice crop farming. In the south, 7.3 percent of households practice fishing, while 69.3 percent of households own or raise livestock in northwest Nigeria.

In the third quarter of 2019, before the COVID-19 pandemic, the sector grew by 14.88% year-on-year. 

The largest driver of the sector remains Crop Production. The Agriculture sector contributed 29.25% to the overall real GDP during the third quarter of 2019.Between January and March 2021, Agriculture contributed to 22.35% of the total Gross Domestic Product.

The sector is being transformed by commercialization at the small, medium and large-scale enterprise levels. On the other hand, the Nigerian Agricultural sector has encountered several challenges, ranging from an obsolete land tenure system that limits access to land, a very low level of irrigation development, limited adoption of research findings and technologies, high cost of farm inputs, poor access to credit due to the mismanagement of specialized institutions established for the development of the agricultural sector, inefficient fertilizer procurement and distribution, insufficient storage facilities and poor access to markets.

More recently, changes in average temperatures, rainfall, climate extremes and growing infestation of pests and related diseases precipitated by climate change pose a great challenge to the integrity of the country's agriculture system.  This is coupled with a high dependence on rain fed agriculture which has made the sector highly vulnerable to adverse seasonal conditions. 

These can all contribute to low agricultural productivity with high post harvest losses and waste in Nigeria.

Illiteracy is also one of the several factors standing against the progress and development of Agriculture in Nigeria. Research has proven that most of the farmers in Nigeria have not acquired formal education.

Dynamics 
Food export accounted for more than 70 percent of the GNP of Nigeria at independence. Twenty-five years later, it was almost a complete reversal with food items accounting for over 50 percent of imports. Food output, however, declined after independence, although, many parts of Sub-Saharan Africa were fertile and potentially productive, per capita food out declined, and grain imports then increased more than seven times. The usage of inorganic fertilizers was therefore promoted by the Nigerian government in the 1970s.
In 1990, 82 million hectares out of Nigeria's total land area of about 91 million hectares were found to be arable. 42 percent of the cultivable area was farmed. Much of this land was farmed under the bush fallow system, whereby land is left idle for a period of time to allow natural regeneration of soil fertility. 18 million hectares were classified as permanent pasture but had the potential to support crops. Most of the 20 million hectares covered by forests and woodlands are believed to have agricultural potential.

Agricultural holdings are small and scattered, and farming is carried out with simple tools.  Large-scale agriculture is not common. Agriculture contributed 32% to GDP in 2001.

Production
Nigeria produced in 2022:

 59.4 million tons of cassava (the largest producer in the world). Nigeria accounts for cassava production of up to 20 per cent of the world, about 34 per cent of Africa’s and about 46 per cent of West Africa’s.
 47.5 million tons of yam (largest producer in the world);
 3.3 million tons of taro (largest producer in the world);
 2.6 million tons of cowpea (largest producer in the world);
 6.8 million tons of sorghum (largest producer in the world);
 2 million tons of okra (2nd largest producer in the world, second only to India);
 2.8 million tons of peanut (3rd largest producer in the world, second only to China and India);
 4 million tons of sweet potato (3rd largest producer in the world, second only to China and Malawi);
 369 thousand tons of ginger (3rd largest producer in the world, losing only to India and China);
 2.2 million tons of millet (4th largest producer in the world, second only to India, Niger and Sudan);
 7.8 million tons of palm oil (4th largest producer in the world, second only to Indonesia, Malaysia and Thailand);
 572 thousand tons of sesame seed (4th largest producer in the world, losing only to Sudan, Myanmar and India);
 332 thousand tons of cocoa (4th largest producer in the world, second only to Ivory Coast, Ghana and Indonesia);
 3 million tons of plantain (5th largest producer in the world);
 833 thousand tons of papaya (6th largest producer in the world);
 1.6 million tons of pineapple (7th largest producer in the world);
 3.9 million tons of tomato (11th largest producer in the world);
 6.8 million tons of rice (one of the largest producers of rice in Africa, 14th largest producer in the world);
 10.1 million tons of maize (14th largest producer in the world);
 7.5 million tons of vegetable;
 1.4 million tons of sugarcane;
 1.3 million tonnes of potato;
 949 thousand tons of mango (including mangosteen and guava);
 938 thousand tons of onion;
 758 thousand tons of soy;
 747 thousand tons of green pepper;
 585 thousand tons of egusi;
 263 thousand tons of sheanut;

In addition to smaller productions of other agricultural products.

Nigeria produced about 2.2 million metric tons of fish in 2008. Livestock production is an essential component of Nigeria agriculture with abundant social and economic potentials. About 60 percent of the ruminant livestock population is found in the country’s semi-arid zone and mostly managed by pastoralists. Domestic production of livestock products is far below the national demand, resulting in large imports of livestock and livestock products. The domestic production of animal products is less than half the demand for beef, mutton and goat meat, while for milk and pork products it is less than quarter the demand

The Sustainable Development Goals in the Agriculture sector in Nigeria has made impact in the export sector responsible for the consumption and production of agricultural products in Nigeria. The exportation sector's monthly earns improved in 4 years. In January 2016, agricultural exports raked in N4.1billions which then rose to N25 billion by January 2017. From April 2019 – March 2020, total agriculture exports hit N289 billion for Nigeria.

Agriculture exports for the first 6 months of 2020 were N204.45 billion, which concerns that productivity is increasing in the sector to enable export growth.

The Sustainable Development Goals has also led to the emergence of various policies that have had impact on the Agriculture sector. Some of them include the Nigerian “Agricultural Promotion Policy—2016–2020” which focuses on ensuring food security through reducing food imports. It covers, among others, institutional reforms and incentives to technological development at the local level. The Empowering Novel Agribusiness-Led Employment Program mobilizes finance for youth-led agribusiness development. Another scheme is the Agricultural Credit Guarantee Scheme Act from 2016, which offers incentives to farmers and other professionals throughout the entire agricultural supply chains. Finally, the “Green Alternative: The Agriculture Promotion Policy” launched in mid-2016. It tries to boost soybean and cowpea production, chosen for their nutritional value and export potential.

Agricultural products 

Major crops include beans, rice,  sesame, cashew nuts, cassava,  cocoa beans, groundnuts,  gum arabic,  kolanut, cocoa, maize (corn),  melon, millet, palm kernels, palm oil, plantains, rice, rubber, sorghum, soybeans, bananas and yams.

In the past, Nigeria was famous for the export of groundnut and palm kernel oil. But over the years, the rate of exportation of this produce has reduced. A few years back local Nigerian companies have commenced exporting groundnuts, cashew nuts, sesame seeds, moringa seeds, Ginger, cocoa etc.

The country's agricultural products fall into two main groups: food crops produced for home consumption, and cash crops sold for profits and also exported abroad. Prior to the Nigerian civil war, the country was self-sufficient in food, but increased steeply after 1973. Bread made from American wheat replaced domestic crops as the cheapest staple food. Between 1980 and 2016, yam production increased from more than 5 million tonnes to 44 million tonnes.

Cocoa 

Cocoa is the leading non-oil foreign exchange earner but the dominance of smallholders and lack of farm labour due to urbanization hold back production, some other factors holding back the production of cocoa include, poor financing, lack of a coordinating body and low uptake of newer varieties of seedlings to rehabilitate old and cultivate new plantations, appear very prominent as identified by various stakeholders.

The challenges have displaced the country from being the second-largest producer of cocoa beans to the fourth, overtaken by Cote d’Ivoire, Ghana and Indonesia. In 1969, Nigeria produced 145,000 tons of cocoa beans, but has the potential for over 300,000 per year. For more productivity, Nigerian Government should give more incentives to cocoa farmers.

Rubber 

Rubber is the second largest non-oil foreign exchange earner. Rubber is grown across different  states in Nigeria, some of the states  includes Edo, Delta, Ondo, Ogun, Abia, Anambra, Akwa Ibom, Cross Rivers, Ebonyi and Bayelsa states.

Oil palm 
The palms industry constitutes a significant sector of the Nigerian economy, providing food and raw materials for the Food, Cosmetics, Pharmaceuticals, Plastics and the Bio-energy industries. In Nigeria the institute that has valuable information about oil palm is the Nigeria Institute for Oil Palm Research. The formal mandate of the institute is to conduct research into the production and products of oil palm and other palms of economic importance and transfer its research findings to farmers.

Cash crop production
Cash crop production historical statistics in Nigeria:

Traditional native crops
Traditional native cereals such as fonio (Digitaria exilis and Digitaria iburua) are still grown in the Middle Belt of central Nigeria.

Other traditional native crops in Nigeria are:
Bambara groundnut
Hausa groundnut
Fluted pumpkin
Castor bean
Melegueta pepper
Cola nut
Green amaranth
Cowpea
Roselle
Okra

Ministry of Agriculture

The government office responsible for Agriculture development and transformation is currently the Federal Ministry of Agriculture and Rural Development. Primarily funded by the Federal Government, the Ministry currently superintends almost fifty parastatals operating as either key departments or agencies across the country. The Ministry has 2 major departments namely Technical and Service Departments: 
Technical Departments: Agriculture (Trees and Crops), Fisheries, Livestock, Land Resources, Fertilizer, Food Reserve & Storage and Rural Development.
Service Departments: Finance, Human Resources, Procurement, PPAS (Plan, Policy, Analysis & Statistics) and Co-operatives.
The ministry is headed by Audu Ogbeh who was appointed by President Muhammad Buhari on 12 November 2015 succeeding Akinwumi Adesina who was elected to head Africa Development Bank.
Buhari also appointed Heineken Lokpobiri as the new Minister of State for Agriculture, and Shehu Ahmad as the Permanent Secretary under a newly created Ministry of Agriculture And Rural Development.

Policies

In 2011, the administration of President Jonathan launched an Agricultural Transformation Agenda which was managed by the Federal Ministry of Agriculture and Rural Development. The intended outcome of the agenda is to promote agriculture as a business, integrate the agricultural value chain and make agriculture a key driver of Nigeria's economic growth. To achieve this agenda the government put in place some new measures:

New fiscal incentives to encourage domestic import substitution
Removal of restrictions on areas of investment and maximum equity ownership in investment by foreign investors
currency exchange controls – free transfer of Capital, Profits and Dividends
Constitutional guarantees against nationalization/expropriation of investments
Zero percent (0%) duty on agricultural machinery and equipment imports
Pioneer Tax holiday for agricultural investments
Duty Waivers and other industry related incentives e.g., based on use of local raw materials, export orientation

Recently, the Central Bank of Nigeria began the Anchors-Borrow program to encourage the cultivation of certain crops, especially rice.

The FG of Nigeria has also closed it land borders in other to curtail rice imports and encourage local production.

See also
Agricultural sustainability in northern Nigeria
Agriculture in Rivers State
Rural development in Nigeria
Deforestation in Nigeria
Yam production in Nigeria
Cassava production in Nigeria
Cocoa production in Nigeria

References

External links
Agriculture & Animals Motherland Nigeria
AgroNigeria: Nigeria's Agricultural Mouthpiece
West African Agricultural Market Observer/Observatoire du Marché Agricole  (RESIMAO)
Major Farming Problems in Nigeria-Crop Farmers and Livestock Rearers